Union Square is a 2011 comedy-drama film directed by Nancy Savoca and starring Mira Sorvino, Tammy Blanchard, and Patti LuPone and displays the inner lives of women. The film premiered at the Toronto International Film Festival on September 16, 2011.

Plot 
Two sisters have a reunion together. One is about to become married while the other has a stressful life. They visit unforeseen places and construct their worlds together while having a reunion.

Cast
Mira Sorvino as Lucy
Mike Doyle as Bill
Tammy Blanchard as Jenny
Patti LuPone as Lucia
Michael Rispoli as Nick
Christopher Backus as Andy
Daphne Rubin-Vega as Sara
Michael Sirow as Jay (voice)
Harper Dill as Trish
Holden Backus as Mike

References

External links
 

2011 films
2011 comedy-drama films
American comedy-drama films
2010s English-language films
Films directed by Nancy Savoca
2010s American films